Joseph O'Donnell Sr. or José O'Donnell y Donnell (Morisk, Tuam, 20 December 1722 – 1787) was an Irish-Spanish general and Colonel of the Spanish Regiment Irlanda. Three of his sons became Spanish generals during the Napoleonic Wars.

Family
O'Donnell married Mariana de Anethan y Mareshal, of Luxemburg. Three of their sons became Spanish generals during the Peninsular War, also known as the Spanish War of Independence. The most famous was Henry O'Donnell, 1st Count of la Bisbal (1769–1834) who was defeated at Vic by Joseph Souham, beaten badly at Margalef by forces under Louis Gabriel Suchet, won a splendid victory at the La Bisbal in 1810 over François Xavier de Schwarz, and successfully concluded the Siege of Pamplona in 1813. Joseph O'Donnell (1768–1836) took part in the successful evacuation of the La Romana Division from Denmark in 1808, was beaten by Nicolas Godinot at Zújar in 1811, and was routed by Jean Isidore Harispe at Castalla in 1812. Charles O'Donnell (1772–1830) helped defend the Lines of Torres Vedras in 1810 and was named Captain General of Valencia in 1811.

References

Irish soldiers
1722 births
1787 deaths
Joseph